The IIFA Award for Best Costume Design is a technical award, chosen ahead of the ceremonies, at the annual International Indian Film Academy Awards.

The winners are listed below:

See also 
 IIFA Awards
 Bollywood
 Cinema of India

References

External links 
 2008 winners 

International Indian Film Academy Awards
Awards for film costume design